Kom Chad Luek is a mass-circulation Thai-language daily newspaper launched in 2001 and published in Bangkok, Thailand, by the Nation Group. Its circulation is in the 500,000–900,000 range.

Controversy

Kom Chad Luek became the target of mass protests after it printed an article on 24 March 2006 that omitted part of a quote by anti-government protest leader Sondhi Limthongkul, with the misquote suggesting Sondhi wanted King Bhumibol Adulyadej to abdicate, which was viewed as an insult to the king, or lèse majesté, which is a crime in Thailand. The paper published a front-page apology on 30 March, begging forgiveness from the king. Protests in front of the newspaper's offices continued however. The paper's editor, Korkhet Chantalertlak, resigned in a show of responsibility, the chief news editor was reassigned, and the paper said it would suspend publication for a total of five days, from 31 March to 2 April and on 8–9 April.

See also
Media in Thailand
Nation Group

References

External links
 Kom Chad Luek

Newspapers published in Thailand
Thai-language newspapers
Publications established in 2001
2001 establishments in Thailand
Mass media in Bangkok
Nation Group